The 2020 Australian Football League finals series was the 124th annual edition of the VFL/AFL finals series, the Australian rules football tournament staged to determine the winner of the 2020 AFL premiership season. The series was scheduled to be played over 4 weekends in October, culminating in the 2020 AFL Grand Final on 24 October 2020.

The top eight teams from the 2020 AFL Premiership season qualified for the finals series. AFL finals series have been played under the current format since 2000.

Qualification

Venues 
In the lead-up to the finals series, all of the league's Victorian and New South Wales clubs had been based temporarily in Queensland for more than three months, owing to border controls and quarantine restrictions during the pandemic which made travel into and out of those states impractical. These restrictions continued into the finals series, meaning Victorian and New South Wales venues were unavailable, although the latter was moot as neither of the New South Wales clubs qualified. Additionally, Western Australian border crossings still required a period of quarantine; due to the bye week between Round 18 and the first week of the finals, it was possible to stage a finals match in the first week of the finals after observing the quarantine, but not possible to play in any later weeks; this was again moot, as West Coast finished fifth and could not qualify for a home final after the first week.

As such, finals venues were limited to Adelaide Oval (South Australia), the Gabba and Metricon Stadium (Queensland) and, in the first week only, Optus Stadium (Western Australia). Clubs entitled to home finals but unable to play in their home states were given the opportunity to nominate a preferred venue for their finals games.

The Grand Final was scheduled in advance to be played at the Gabba, irrespective of the teams involved. It was the first time that the Grand Final had been played outside Victoria.

Matches 

The system used for the 2020 AFL finals series is a final eight system. The top four teams in the eight receive the "double chance" when they play in week-one qualifying finals, such that if a top-four team loses in the first week it still remains in the finals, playing a semi-final the next week against the winner of an elimination final. The bottom four of the eight play knock-out games – only the winners survive and move on to the next week. Home-state advantage ordinarily goes to the team with the higher ladder position in the first two weeks, to the qualifying final winners in the third week, but due to the COVID-19 pandemic, some states are unable to host matches.

In the second week, the losers of the qualifying finals play the elimination finals winners in a semi-final, while the winners of the qualifying finals receive byes. In the third week, the winners of the semi-finals play the winners of the qualifying finals. The winners of those matches move on to the Grand Final.

Week One (Qualifying and Elimination finals)

First Qualifying final (Port Adelaide vs Geelong)
The first qualifying final saw minor premier  host fourth placed . This marked the fourth final between the two sides, having previously met in a semi-final in 2013, qualifying final in 2004, and, most notably, the 2007 Grand Final, which was won by Geelong by a record-breaking 119-point margin, which stands as the record to this day.

Scorecard

Second Qualifying Final (Brisbane Lions vs Richmond)
The Second Qualifying Final saw second-placed  play third-placed . This marked the second straight season the two teams met in the Second Qualifying Final, with Richmond defeating the Lions by 47 points in 2019 en route to their second premiership in three years. In addition, they had also played in a preliminary final in 2001, which Brisbane won by 68 points en route to their first of three consecutive premierships.

Scorecard

Second Elimination Final (St Kilda vs Western Bulldogs)
The Second Elimination Final saw sixth placed  host the seventh placed . This marked the fifth final between the two teams, having previously clashed in consecutive preliminary finals in 2009 and 2010 in addition to semi finals in 1992 and 1961.

Scorecard

First Elimination Final (West Coast vs Collingwood)
The First Elimination final saw fifth-placed  host eighth-placed . This marked the ninth final between the two sides, having previously contested a qualifying final and replay in 1990, a qualifying final in 1994, a semi final in 2007, a qualifying final in 2011, a semi-final in 2012 and both a qualifying final and grand final in 2018. 

Scorecard

Week Two (Semi-Finals)

Second Semi-Final (Richmond vs St Kilda)
The Second Semi-Final saw  host . This was just the fourth final between the two teams and the first in 47 years, having previously clashed in semi-finals in 1939 and 1973, in addition to a preliminary final in 1971.

Scorecard

First Semi-Final (Geelong vs Collingwood)
The First Semi-Final saw  play . This marked the twenty-fifth final between the two sides - having met in six grand finals in 1925, 1930, 1937, 1952, 1953 and 2011. In addition they had contested a qualifying final the previous season and in 1981, semi finals in 1901, 1927, 1951, 1952, 1953, 1967, and preliminary finals in 1930, 1938, 1955, 1964, 1980, 2007, 2009 and 2010.

Scorecard

Week Three (Preliminary finals)

First Preliminary Final (Port Adelaide vs Richmond)
The First Preliminary Final saw  face . This marked the second finals meeting between the two sides, after the 2014 First Elimination Final, which Port Adelaide won by 57 points.

Scorecard

Second Preliminary Final (Brisbane Lions vs Geelong)

The Second Preliminary Final was contested between Brisbane and Geelong. This was the second final played between the two sides, having also met in a preliminary final in 2004, which Brisbane won by 9 points. 
 
Scorecard

Week Four (Grand Final)

This was only the third time in AFL/VFL history where neither of the two top qualifying teams made the grand final. The previous two occasions occurred in 1980 and the previous year, 2019.  were also involved in both of those Grand Finals. This marked the third Grand Final between the two teams, having previously met in the 1931 and 1967 premiership deciders. Including those two Grand Finals, this marked the twelfth final between the two sides, having also previously met in semi-finals in 1921, 1931, 1934, 1969 and 1980; preliminary finals in 1933, 1995 and 2019; and a qualifying final in 2017. The overall head-to-head record in finals prior to this match was 9–2 in Richmond's favour, with one Grand Final victory apiece.

References

External links

AFL finals series official website

Finals Series, 2020